David Stark is the name of:

 David C. Stark (born 1950), Professor of Sociology and International Affairs at Columbia University
 David D. Stark (1893-unknown), scientist associated with the Dean-Stark apparatus
 David Stark, member of Asta Kask